I'm a Stranger Too! is the title of the debut recording of Chris Smither. It was re-released on CD along with Don't It Drag On in 2002. Bonnie Raitt covered "Love (Me) Like a Man" on her second album Give It Up.

Track listing
All songs by Chris Smither unless otherwise noted.
 "A Short While Ago"
 "A Song for Susan"
 "I Am a Child" (Neil Young)
 "Have You Seen My Baby?" (Randy Newman)
 "Devil Got Your Woman"
 "Homunculus"
 "Love You Like a Man"
 "Lonely Time"
 "Look Down the Road"
 "Old Kentucky Home (Turpentine and Dandelion Wine)" (Randy Newman)
 "Time to Go Home"

Personnel
Chris Smither – vocals, acoustic guitar, arrangements
John Bailey - acoustic and rhythm guitar, background vocals, arrangements
Richard Davis - electric bass
Russell George - acoustic bass, fiddle
Al Rogers - drums, tambourine

Production
Produced by Michael Cuscuna and Ron Frangipane
Engineered by Jay Tropp & Brooks Arthur
Milton Glaser - graphic design
Jim Bogin - photography

References

1970 debut albums
Chris Smither albums
Albums produced by Michael Cuscuna
Tomato Records albums